

Historical novels arranged by the period of their setting

Rome as a Kingdom
If you know of works set in the pre-Republican era, please expand this section.
 Founding Fathers (1959) by Alfred Duggan. Originally titled Children of the Wolf, this novel tells the story of King Romulus and the founding of Rome through the eyes of a variety of characters who come to the new city.
 Roma (2007) by Steven Saylor. According to the author's website, the book covers part of Rome's early history.

Early Republic (before 264 BC)
If you know of works set in the Early Republic, please expand this section.
 Roma, published March 6, 2007, by Steven Saylor. According to the author's website, the book covers part of Rome's early history.
 The Etruscan by Mika Waltari. Part of the story is set on the first few years of the Republic.
 Traitors’ Legion (Ace G-532,1963) by Jay Scotland, a swashbucker about a disgraced legion, set in Hannibal's time.

Middle Republic (264–133 BC)
If you know of works set in the Middle Republic, please expand this section.
 Roma, published March 6, 2007, by Steven Saylor. According to the author's website, the book covers part of Rome's Republican history.
 Scipio: A Novel, published March 1998 by Ross Leckie (Scottish writer).  This is the second book in a loose trilogy about the Second Punic War.
 Scipio trilogy by Santiago Posteguillo (the Punic Wars general Publius Cornelius Scipio)
Africanus, el hijo del cónsul
Las legiones malditas
La traición de Roma
 Of Merchants & Heroes, published 2008 by Paul Waters. Set at the end of the 3rd century BC, about the life of a fictional Roman called Marcus. In the novel Marcus becomes involved in the war against Philip V of Macedon, which was led by Titus Quinctius Flamininus, who later became Consul and is a major character in the story.
 "Salammbô", published 1977 by  Gustave Flaubert. 240 BC. The novel is set  before and during the Mercenary War, an uprising of mercenaries in the employ of Carthage in the 3rd century BC.
 "The Shield of Rome", published 2011 by William Kelso. 216 BC. The novel is set during "Rome's finest hour" after the battle of Cannae when Hannibal threatens the very existence of the Republic.
 "The Fortune of Carthage", published 2012 by William Kelso. 207 BC. The novel is set during the 2nd Punic War and covers Hasdrubal Barca's attempt to link up with the Carthaginian army of his brother Hannibal.
 "Rome: Destroy Carthage", published 2013 by David Gibbins. 146 BC. The novel was written to promote the strategy game "Rome 2 Total War" and is set during the 3nd Punic War and covers the siege and utter destruction of Carthage.

Late Republic (after 132 BC)
 Viriato by João Aguiar (late 2nd, early 1st century BC, Viriathus)
 The Bow of Heaven (2011) by Andrew Levkoff, a novel of events leading up to the battle of Carrhae, and the triumvir responsible for one of the greatest defeats suffered by Republican Rome, Marcus Licinius Crassus
 Young Caesar (1958) by Rex Warner
 Imperium and Lustrum (novel) by Robert Harris, the first two volumes of a trilogy of fictionalized biography told by his slave, later freedman, Tiro depicting Cicero's rise to the consulship in 63 BC and subsequent role in the final days of the Republic.
 A Pillar of Iron (1965) by Taylor Caldwell, a fictionalized biography of Cicero.
 Imperial Caesar (1960) also by Rex Warner
 The Ides of March (1948) by Thornton Wilder, culminating in Caesar's assassination.
 Caesar, Antony by Allan Massie
 Freedom, farewell! by Phyllis Bentley.
 The Roma Sub Rosa series by Steven Saylor is set in the later years of the Republic and the beginning of the Augustan period.
 Roma, published March 6, 2007, by Steven Saylor. According to the author's website, the book covers part of Rome's early history.
 The Emperor Series (2003-2013), by Conn Iggulden, Julius Caesar's life
 The Last King: Rome's Greatest Enemy (2005) by Michael Curtis Ford.  The career of Mithridates VI (134-63 BC)
 The Masters of Rome series by Colleen McCullough.  Beginning before the birth of Julius Caesar to after his death, it details the self-immolation of the Roman Republic.
 Spartacus by Howard Fast
 Spartacus by Lewis Grassic Gibbon
 Three's Company (1958) by Alfred Duggan.  The career of Lepidus, triumvir with Octavian and Marcus Antonius after the death of Julius Caesar.
 Winter Quarters (1956) by Alfred Duggan. Two Gauls in the time of Julius Caesar, one of whom is under a curse from the Mother Goddess, whose worship he finds throughout the Roman world.
 The Conquered by Naomi Mitchison (1923).  Gaul & the Gallic Wars 1st century BC
 Beric the Briton: A Story of the Roman Invasion (1893) by G. A. Henty
 Imperial Caesar (1960) also by Rex Warner

Early/High Empire (27 BC to AD 192)
 Someday Never Comes by Mk Kayem
 An Imaginary Life by David Malouf. A fictional account of the poet Ovid's exile from Rome.
 The Quest For the Lost Roman Legions by Tony Clunn, Battle of the Teutoburg Forest, with his account of his discovery of the battlefield
 Persona Non Grata, Terra Incognita, Medicus and Caveat Emptor, a series of mysteries featuring the "reluctant sleuth" Gaius Petreius Ruso by Ruth Downie, set around 120 AD.
 Three Legions series by Rosemary Sutcliff set in Roman Britain c. 130 AD.  The three novels consist of The Eagle of the Ninth (1954), The Silver Branch (1957), and The Lantern Bearers (1959).  The three were first collected in one volume as Three Legions in 1980.
 Empire published August 31, 2010, by Steven Saylor.  The book follows two families through Rome's Imperial history, from the reign of Augustus to the reign of Hadrian. The sequel to Roma.
 Vespasian series by Robert Fabbri. The series details the early career and rise to power of Vespasian.

The Julio-Claudian Dynasty
 The Nero Prediction by Humphry Knipe
 The Roman (1964) by Mika Waltari
 The Tribune: A Novel of Ancient Rome by Patrick Larkin
 Augustus by John Williams
 Augustus, Tiberius, Caligula and Nero's Heirs by Allan Massie
 Empire: The Novel of Imperial Rome by Steven Saylor
 Let the Emperor Speak: A novel of Caesar Augustus by Allan Massie, Doubleday & Company, Inc, New York, 1987 (First published in Great Britain in 1986 by the Bodley Head as Augustus). Also by this author: Caesar, Anthony, Tiberius, Caligula and Nero's Heirs.
 Pretender by Lion Feuchtwanger

Books about early Christians or Jesus include:
 Ben-Hur: A Tale of the Christ (1880) by Lew Wallace; famously made into a film starring Charlton Heston; set in the reign of Tiberius in Judaea, the Mediterranean, and Rome. Epilogues carry the story into the reign of Nero
 I Am a Barbarian (1967, written 1941) by Edgar Rice Burroughs; the fictionalized memoirs of Caligula's slave.
 A Voice in the Wind (1994) by Francine Rivers; the story of Hadassah, a Christian slave taken from Jerusalem and taken to Rome in the time of Titus and his father Mark of the Lion Trilogy book 1
 An Echo in the Darkness (1995) by Francine Rivers; the continuing story of Hadassah and Marcus. Mark of the Lion Trilogy book 2
 As Sure as the Dawn (1995) by Francine Rivers; the continuing story of Atretes. Mark of the Lion Trilogy book 3
 The Robe (1942), by Lloyd C. Douglas, set in the same period as Ben-Hur; like Ben-Hur, more famous as a film.

Books about Claudius or set in his reign include:
 I, Claudius (1934) and its sequel, Claudius the God (1935), by Robert Graves. The classic and influential dramatised account of the life of the emperor Claudius, made into a popular TV series (see below).
 The Eagle series by Nigerian-born British novelist Simon Scarrow.  The first book Under the Eagle (part of the Eagle series) was published 2000 by Simon Scarrow.  Story of Roman invasion of Britain, featuring a young Vespasian. Other books in the series include The Eagle's Conquest (2001 set in 42 AD (introducing Boudicca at the end);  When the Eagle Hunts (2002) set in 44 AD.  Other books in the series include The Eagle and the Wolves (2003), The Eagle's Prey (2004), The Eagle's Prophecy (2005), The Eagle in the Sand (2006), and the forthcoming Centurion (January - 2008).

Books set in Nero's reign include:
 Beric the Briton, A Story of the Roman Invasion (1893) by G. A. Henty; the story of a Romanized Briton captured as a rebel and sent to Rome as a gladiator
 Quo Vadis (1895/1896), by Henryk Sienkiewicz set in the reign of Nero in 64 AD.
 The Flames of Rome by Paul L. Maier
 A Song for Nero (2003) by Tom Holt, writing as Thomas Holt.
 Nero, the Bloody Poet by Dezső Kosztolányi
 Imperial Governor (1968, reprinted 2002), George Shipway, the Icenii revolt under Boudicca.
 The Roman (1964) by Mika Waltari
 The Cleft by Doris Lessing is a book supposedly written by an historian during Nero's reign.

The Flavian Dynasty
  Josephus Trilogy (1959), by Lion Feuchtwanger about Flavius Josephus, but set in Ancient Rome during Reign of Vespasianus and Titus
  The Course of Honour (1998), the first novel by Lindsey Davis (later author of the Marcus Didius Falco mysteries, which also take place during the reign on Vespasianus) narrates the history of Vespasian's imperial freedwoman mistress Antonia Caenis.
  The Light Bearer (1994), by Donna Gillespie tells the story of a Germanic female warrior who becomes a gladiator in Rome in the reign of Domitian.
 The Last Days of Pompeii by E.G.Bulwer-Lytton
 Pompeii by Robert Harris, tells the story of Pompeii and the volcano Vesuveus during the reign of Titus.
 The Jew of Rome by Lion Feuchtwanger

The Nervan-Antonian (Ulpio-Aelia) Dynasty
 Empress of the Seven Hills by Kate Quinn is set during the reign of Trajan.
 Lady of the Eternal City by Kate Quinn is set during the reign of Hadrian.
 Memoirs of Hadrian (1951) by Marguerite Yourcenar
 The Emperor by Georg Ebers, another fictitious biography of Hadrian
 A God Strolling in the Cool of the Evening (1994) by Mario de Carvalho, set mainly in Roman Lusitania

Middle Empire (AD 193–293)
Family Favourites (1960), by Alfred Duggan; a tale of court life under the teenage emperor Elagabalus, as recounted by his personal bodyguard
Warrior Of Rome series by historian Harry Sidebottom, takes place in the years 238 to 264, mostly from 256 to 264, six books so far published
Iron And Rust also by historian Harry Sidebottom, takes place before the Warrior Of Rome series

Late Empire: West (AD 293–457)
 Helena by Evelyn Waugh; follows the quest of the Empress Helena, a Christian and the mother of Emperor Constantine to uncover the remains of the cross upon which Christ was crucified.
 Julian (1964) by Gore Vidal, fictionalized biography of the emperor Julian the Apostate, who tried to revive Paganism
 The Last Legion: A Novel by Valerio Massimo Manfredi; fictionalized story of the emperor Romulus Augustulus and what might have happened to his surviving retinue.
 Eagle in the Snow (1970) by Wallace Breem; set in Britannia and Germania in the late 4th and early 5th century; features a Mithraic Roman general.
 The Little Emperors (1951) by Alfred Duggan. A succession of coups in late-Roman Britain.
 Gods And Legions: A Novel of the Roman Empire (2002) by Michael Curtis Ford
 The Sword of Attila: A Novel of the Last Years of Rome (2005) by Michael Curtis Ford
 The Fall of Rome: A Novel of a World Lost (2007) by Michael Curtis Ford
 Raptor (1993) by Gary Jennings is an historical novel set in the late 5th and early 6th centuries. It purports to be the memoirs of an Ostrogoth, Thorn, who has a secret.
 Threshold of Fire: A Novel of Fifth Century Rome (1966) by Hella Haasse
 Legionary (2011) by Gordon Doherty
 Legionary: Viper of the North (2012) by Gordon Doherty
 Legionary: Land of the Sacred Fire (2013) by Gordon Doherty
 Legionary: The Scourge of Thracia (2015) by Gordon Doherty
 Legionary: Gods & Emperors (2015) by Gordon Doherty
 Legionary: Empire of Shades (2017) by Gordon Doherty
 Legionary: The Blood Road (2018) by Gordon Doherty
 Legionary: Dark Eagle (2020) by Gordon Doherty
 Legionary: The Emperor's Shield (2023) by Gordon Doherty
 Legionary: Eagles in the Desert (2020) by Gordon Doherty
 Sons of Rome (2020) by Gordon Doherty & S.J.A. Turney
 Masters of Rome (2021) by Gordon Doherty & S.J.A. Turney
 Gods of Rome (2021) by Gordon Doherty & S.J.A. Turney

Byzantine Empire (AD 457–1453)
 Anna of Byzantium, 1999
 Bélisaire
 Belisarius series by David Drake and Eric Flint
 Count Belisarius (1938), by Robert Graves, set in the 6th century, in the reign of Justinian
 The Dancing Bear (1972), by Peter Dickinson. Young adult.
 Justinian, a novel, by H N Turteltaub (Harry Turtledove), August 1998
 The Palaeologian Dynasty. The Rise and Fall of Byzantium
 Roma Eterna (2003), by Robert Silverberg
 A Struggle for Rome (1876), by Felix Dahn
 Tirant lo Blanch (finished posthumously by Martí Joan de Galba, published 1490), by Joanot Martorell
 Up the Line (1969), by Robert Silverberg
 Strategos: Born in the Borderlands (2011) by Gordon Doherty
 Strategos: Rise of the Golden Heart (2011) by Gordon Doherty
 Strategos: Island in the Storm (2011) by Gordon Doherty

Unknown period
 Avventura nel primo secolo by Paolo Monelli
 Three's Company, Winter Quarters, Conscience of the King, The Little Emperors and Family Favourites by Alfred Duggan
 Antonia by Brenda Jagger
 The Tribune: A Novel of Ancient Rome by Patrick Larkin
 Hadrian's Wall: A Novel by William Dietrich
 The Centurion: A Novel (1986) by Jan de Hartog
 The Nero Prediction by Humphry Knipe

Detective fiction
  Search the Seven Hills (The Quirinal Hill Affair) (1987) by Barbara Hambly 
 The Roma Sub Rosa series (1991–2012) by Steven Saylor, starts with Roman Blood (1991); the books cover the period 92 BC to 46 BC.
 The Marcus Didius Falco series by Lindsey Davis, starts with The Silver Pigs; set in the reign of Vespasian.
 The SPQR series by John Maddox Roberts.
 The Marcus Corvinus (fictional character) series by David Wishart
 The  Roman Mysteries young adults' detective/drama series by Caroline Lawrence
 The Caius Trilogy by German author Henry Winterfeld: Caius ist ein Dummkopf (Caius is an Idiot); Caius geht ein Licht auf (Caius has an Inspiration), and Caius in der Klemme (Caius in a Fix). The first part was published in English with the alternate title Detectives in Togas.  The second was published in English with the alternate title Mystery of the Roman Ransom.
 The Eagle series by Simon Scarrow (see above)
 The Germanicus Mosaic series by Rosemary Rowe - set in later Roman Britain

Science fiction/time travel novels
 Caesar's Bicycle (1997) (Timeline Wars series) by John Barnes
 Arria Marcella (1852) by Théophile Gautier set in 79 AD in Pompeii
 Household Gods (1999), by Judith Tarr and Harry Turtledove set in the reign of Marcus Aurelius
 The Time Travelling Cat and the Roman Eagle (2001) by Julia Jarman
 "Codex Alera" Jim Butcher's fantasy take on what happened to the Lost Roman Legion.

Alternate history
The following alternate history novels are set in fictional universes where Rome's struggle with Carthage went differently
 The Seven Hills (2005) by John Maddox Roberts
 Delenda Est by Poul Anderson
 Lest Darkness Fall (1939) by L. Sprague de Camp; a time-travelling American alters history, set in 535 AD.
 Agent of Byzantium by Harry Turtledove set in an alternate 14th century with no Islam.
 Hannibal's Children (2002) and its sequel The Seven Hills by John Maddox Roberts.  A victorious Hannibal sends all the Romans into exile, but they found a new city and their descendants return for vengeance.

The following alternate history novels are set in fictional universes where the Roman Empire never fell, and has endured to the present day:
 Romanitas (2005), by Sophia McDougall
 Rome Burning (2006), sequel to Romanitas, by Sophia McDougall
 Roma Eterna, a 2003 novel by Robert Silverberg
 Warlords of Utopia by Lance Parkin
 Gunpowder Empire by Harry Turtledove
 The Aquiliad (1983), by Somtow Sucharitkul.  Circa 50 AD.  A light-hearted novel in which Roman legions discover America, battle the Aztecs, encounter Big Foot, and drive off flying saucers.
 Oebis (2002), by Scott Mackay.  Romans return to a modern-day Earth to retake it from alien invaders who exiled them centuries ago and imposed a strange form of Christianity.
 The Germanicus trilogy, a collection of books by Kirk Mitchell.
 Emperor (2006), by Stephen Baxter.  After a Celtic chieftain obeys an ancient prophecy, and sides with the invaders, the history of Roman Britain takes a different path.  First in a series.

Comic books
 The Adventures of Alix (1948–now) series by Jacques Martin of which some titles are set in Rome and the Ancient World. This series has a spin-off, called The travels of Alix, that gives illustrated information on famous places and empires of the Ancient World during the Roman Era.
 Astérix (1959–now) series by René Goscinny (stories) and Albert Uderzo (illustrations).  A tiny village in Gaul holds out against the Roman Army, and its doughtiest warriors meet all the famous Romans.
 Murena (1997–now) series by Jean Dufaux and Philippe Delaby
 Le Fléau des Dieux (2000–2006) series by Valérie Mangin and Aleksa Gajic. Science fiction set in a remote future

Movies

 Quo Vadis - U.S. 1951 director Mervyn LeRoy
 The Robe - U.S. 1953 director Henry Koster
 Demetrius and the Gladiators - U.S. 1954 director Delmer Daves (sequel to The Robe)
 Jupiter's Darling - U.S. 1955 director George Sidney, based on a play by Robert E. Sherwood
 Ben-Hur - U.S. 1959 director William Wyler
 Spartacus - U.S. 1960 director Stanley Kubrick
 King of Kings - U.S. 1961 director Nicholas Ray
 Cleopatra - U.S. 1963 director Joseph L. Mankiewicz
 The Fall of the Roman Empire - U.S. 1964 director Anthony Mann
 The Greatest Story Ever Told - U.S. 1965 director George Stevens
 A Funny Thing Happened on the Way to the Forum - U.S. 1966 director Richard Lester
 Fellini Satyricon - Italy 1969 director Federico Fellini
 Jesus Christ Superstar - U.S. 1973 director Norman Jewison
 Sebastiane - UK 1976 director Derek Jarman
 Caligula - U.S. 1979 director Tinto Brass
 Monty Python's Life of Brian - U.K. 1979 director Terry Jones
 History of the World Part 1 - U.S. 1981 director Mel Brooks
 The Last Temptation of Christ - U.S. 1988 director Martin Scorsese
 Titus - U.S. 1999 director Julie Taymor
 Gladiator - U.S. 2000 director Ridley Scott
 Quo Vadis - Polish/U.S. 2001 director Jerzy Kawalerowicz, remake of 1951 film
 King Arthur - U.S. 2004 director Antoine Fuqua
 The Passion of the Christ - U.S. 2004 director Mel Gibson
 The Nativity Story - U.S. 2006 director Catherine Hardwicke
 Agora - Spain 2009 director Alejandro Amenábar
 Centurion - UK 2010 director Neil Marshall
 The Eagle - UK 2011 director Kevin Macdonald

Plays
Joseph Addison
 Cato
Albert Camus
 Caligula
Pierre Corneille
 Cinna
Henrik Ibsen
Emperor and Galilean
Ben Jonson
 Sejanus, His Fall
Heinrich von Kleist
 Die Hermannsschlacht
William Shakespeare
 Titus Andronicus
 Julius Caesar
 Antony and Cleopatra
 Coriolanus
 Cymbeline
Robert Sherwood
The Road to Rome (1927), on which a little-known 1955 film Jupiter's Darling was based.
Stephen Sondheim
 A Funny Thing Happened on the Way to the Forum

Television
 I, Claudius
 Julius Caesar minisieries by Uli Edel
 Masada
 Mystery Science Theater 3000 (part of season 8)
 Pompeii: The Last Day a dramatized documentary
 The Roman Holidays
 Rome
 Spartacus miniseries by Robert Dornhelm (director)
 Spartacus: Blood and Sand
 Up Pompeii!
 Bread and Circuses (Star Trek: The Original Series)

Video games

Works inspired by Roman history, or by works of fiction and non-fiction about Rome

Science fiction
 Empire of the Atom, by A. E. van Vogt, translates Graves' novel about Claudius(above) into a science fiction context.
 The Foundation series by Isaac Asimov, about the fall of a galactic empire, is derived from Gibbon's Decline and Fall of the Roman Empire.
 Dominic Flandry series by Poul Anderson, a space empire similarly inspired by Gibbon's history (and by Asimov) is decaying and about to collapse into a Long Night of barbarism; a heroic secret agent fights to stave off this fate. 
 Julian Comstock by Robert Charles Wilson, about a post-apocalyptic America transformed into a neo-Roman Empire, and a high born youth who, like Julian the Apostate, fights the power of the Church.
 Bread and Circuses (Star Trek: The Original Series)
 Tarzan and the Lost Empire by Edgar Rice Burroughs, a surviving fragment of the Roman Empire is discovered hidden in a corner of 20th century Africa.
 In Philip K. Dick's VALIS ancient Rome is superimposed over the present (California in the 20th century) and the far future world of The Android Cried Me a River to reveal "the Empire" – a supra- or trans-temporal constant. Furthermore, it is often repeated that the empire never fell. Also the novel's protagonist is described as living in two spacetime-continua with one of the personalities presently living in ancient Rome. Ancient Rome is also described as to breaking through into the modern world and "real time" is speculated as to having ceased in 70 AD with Roman times still being present.

Comic books
 Leading Comics - in the 1940s, a series called "Nero Fox" (about a talking animal  named Nero Fox, who was emperor of Rome) was published as a backup series in this comic title.
 Trigan Empire was a Science Fiction comic series telling of adventures on the planet Elekton with many similarities to the Roman Empire

See also

 Fiction set in Ancient Greece
 List of historical fiction by time period

References

External links
 Fictional Rome
 The Detective and the Toga - Roman mysteries

 
Lists of novels